Wilbur Leon Howard (January 8, 1949 – December 17, 2022) was an American outfielder in Major League Baseball who played for the Milwaukee Brewers (1973) and the Houston Astros (1974–1978).

Howard was selected in the 19th round of the 1969 Major League Baseball Draft by the Seattle Pilots, who would move to Milwaukee and become the Brewers after the season. Howard played in the Brewers organization for the next four seasons, getting a September call-up in 1973, when he batted .205 in 39 at bats. The following spring, he was traded to the Astros in exchange for the star-crossed Larry Yount and another minor leaguer.

Howard started the  season in the minor leagues, but was called up in mid-June, spending the rest of the season as the Astros' fourth outfielder. In , he remained in that role, although the Astros rotated their other outfielders (Greg Gross, César Cedeño, and José Cruz) out of the lineup often enough that Howard played in 121 games, batting .283 with 32 stolen bases, which was eighth in the league and second on the team to Cedeño's 50.

In , however, manager Bill Virdon moved Howard back into a more traditional fourth outfielder role, and he continued to serve in that capacity for three seasons. After spending  in the minor leagues with the Charleston Charlies, Howard called it quits.

References

Sources

1949 births
2022 deaths
Major League Baseball outfielders
Houston Astros players
Milwaukee Brewers players
Baseball players from North Carolina
African-American baseball players
Charleston Charlies players
Clinton Pilots players
Denver Bears players
Evansville Triplets players
Newark Co-Pilots players
Portland Beavers players
21st-century African-American people
20th-century African-American sportspeople
People from Gaston County, North Carolina